Cylindropuntia ganderi, also known as Gander cholla and Gander's buckhorn cholla, is a cholla native to the Sonoran desert of Baja California, Mexico, and the adjacent border area of southern California, US where it intergrades with Cylindropuntia californica.

References 

ganderi
Cacti of the United States
Flora of the California desert regions
North American desert flora
Flora without expected TNC conservation status